La Diosa impura is a 1963 Argentine-Mexican film, directed by Armando Bó and directed by Carmelo Santiago.

Plot

Laura, played by Isabel Sarli runs away to Mexico after being implicated in a murder.  There she meets a painter who asks her to pose for him.  She later meets his brother, Julio played by Julio Alemán and falls in love but everything goes wrong when her mobster boyfriend comes looking for her.

Cast

Isabel Sarli as Laura
Julio Alemán as Julio Molina Vargas
Mario Lozano as Martín
Víctor Junco as Pedro Molina Vargas
Armando Bó as Reynoso
Mario Casado as Martin's accomplice

References

External links
 

1963 films
1960s Spanish-language films
Argentine black-and-white films
Films directed by Armando Bó
1960s Argentine films